The Service de sécurité incendie de Montréal (SIM; French for 'Montreal Fire Department') is responsible for fire and rescue operations in Montreal, Quebec, Canada. EMS first-response has been available in limited areas since 1976 and to the entire service area since 2009. The SIM is the 7th largest fire department in North America. The department offers high-angle rescue (Stations 13, 27 and 47), collapse rescue (stations 13, 27 and 47), hazmat response (Station 29 and 65), ice rescue (stations 15, 35, 38, 57 and 64) and nautical rescue (stations 14, 15, 35, 38, 55, 57, 64 and 66).

History

Paid fire services in the city of Montreal date back to 1863.

In 2002, as the result of provincially mandated municipal mergers, the 23 existing suburban fire services were merged with that of the City of Montreal to form the SIM, which now serves over 1.9 million people.

List of predecessor departments

Anjou Fire Department
Baie d'Urfé Volunteer Fire Department
Cote Saint Luc Fire Department
Dollard-des-Ormeaux Fire Department - EMS
Dorval Fire Department
Hampstead Fire Department - EMS
LaSalle Fire Department
Lachine Fire Department
Montreal East Fire Department
Montreal North Fire Department
Montreal West Fire Department - EMS
Outremont Fire Department - EMS
Pointe Claire-Beaconsfield-Kirkland Fire Department - EMS
Roxboro Volunteer Fire Brigade
Saint-Laurent Fire Department
Saint-Leonard Fire Department
Sainte-Anne-de-Bellevue Fire Department
Sainte-Genevieve Fire Department
Senneville Fire Department
Pierrefonds-Ile Bizard Fire Department (Service de la prévention des incendies Pierrefonds-Ile Bizard)
City of Montreal Fire Department (Service de la prévention des incendies Montreal)
Town of Mount Royal Fire Department
Verdun Fire Department
Westmount Fire Department - EMS

Note: EMS means department responded to calls for emergency medical service.

Operations

The SIM comprises the following operating divisions:
There are 67 fire stations across Montreal, staffed by 2700 employees (2300 fire fighters and 400 support staff).

Each station is under the supervision of a Captain and a Lieutenant, both wearing a red helmet. The department is divided into 6 Divisions, or Battalion Districts. Each Division is under the command of a Division Chief. Divisions 1,2,3,4 and 5 have 12 Stations and Division 6 has 7 Stations.

Division # 1 - Division # 1 consists of Stations  51,52,53,54,55,56,57,58,59,61,62,71
Division # 2 - Division # 2 consists of Stations 3,15,23,33,46,63,64,65,66,67,77,78 
Division # 3 - Division # 3 consists of Stations 4,27,34,35,37,42,49,72,73,74,75,76
Division # 4 - Division # 4 consists of Stations 8,9,14,17,18,21,22,28,32,38,43,44
Division # 5 - Division # 5 consists of Stations 13,26,29,30,31,39,40,41,45,47,48,50
Division # 6 - Division # 6 consists of Stations 2,5,10,16,19,20,25

Fire Apparatus

The SIM inherited all the vehicles of the fire departments prior to the 2002 amalgamation. Most have been replaced by new apparatus in subsequent years. In 2007, the SIM started replacing most of its older Spartan pumpers and aerial ladders with newer E-One Cyclone II apparatus. As of 2012, the SIM has signed a contract for 35 new Spartan Metro Star pumpers at the rate of seven delivered each year until 2017, as well as 3 Spartan Metro Star heavy rescue trucks.

Fire Apparatus in the SIM are denoted by a certain number and their corresponding station number, for example, all pumpers in the SIM are designated by the number 2, followed by the Pumper's station number (i.e., the Pumper from Station 52 would be 252). The numbering system is as follows:

100 - Chief (Voitures d'état-major)
200 - Pumper (Autopompe) - M = foam/mousse, marked on vehicle, but not said on the air.
2000 - 2nd Pumper in a station
400 - Aerial ladder truck
4000 - Tower ladder
500 - Light Rescue
600 - Heavy Rescue
6000 - Tanker
700 - Elevating Platform
800 - (Not attributed, use for EMS dispatch)
8000 - Utility
900 - Support
9000 - Fire Prevention
1000 - Command Post
1200 - Rehab/First Aid unit
1300 - Canteem
1400 - Shelter bus
1500 - Inflatable boat
1600 - Air cascade unit
1700 - Hazmat
1800 - Boat
1900 - Trailer
2100 - Ice rescue trailer
2200 - Foam trailer
2300 - Boat trailer

Headquarters - 4040, avenue du Parc

101 (Fire Chief) - Dodge Journey GT AWD 2017
102 (Deputy Chief) - Dodge Journey R/T AWD 2014
103 (Deputy Chief) - Dodge Journey R/T AWD 2014
104 (Assistant Chief) - Dodge Journey R/T AWD 2014
105 (Assistant Chief) - Dodge Journey R/T AWD 2014
106 (Assistant Chief) - Dodge Journey R/T AWD 2014
107 (Assistant Chief) - Dodge Journey R/T AWD 2014
108 (Assistant Chief) - Dodge Journey R/T AWD 2014
941  - Nissan Leaf 2017
951  - Dodge Caravan 2016

Division 1

Fire Stations 51,52,53,54,55,56,57,58,59,61,62,71

111 (Division Chief) - Dodge Journey R/T AWD 2015
131 (Operations Chief) - Ford Explorer Police Interceptor AWD 2018
141 (Operations Chief) - Ford Explorer Police Interceptor AWD 2018

Fire Station 51 - 550, boulevard des Anciens-Combattants, Sainte-Anne-de-Bellevue

251 - Pierce Saber FR6010 / Maxi Métal 2019 1250gpm./440gal
451 - Emergency One Cyclone II 2010 30 m.
6051 - Sterling / Levasseur 2007 2910gal

Fire Station 52 - 330, rue Surrey, Baie-d'Urfé

252 - Emergency One Cyclone II 2010 1500gpm./600gal
452 - Rosenbauer Commander 2015 / Rosenbauer Viper 100'

Fire Station 53 - 310, rue Beaurepaire, Beaconsfield

253 -Spartan Metro Star / Maxi Métal 2014 1250gpm./450gal

Fire Station 54 - 3048, boulevard Saint-Charles, Kirkland

254 - Emergency One Cyclone II 2010 1500gpm./600gal

Fire Station 55 - 401, boulevard Saint-Jean, Pointe-Claire

255M - 2020 Pierce MaxiSaber FR7010 pumper (1250/440/66F)
455 - Rosenbauer Commander 2016/ Rosenbauer Viper 100'
555 - Ford F-550 XL Super Duty / Maxi-Métal 2007
1555 - Zodiac G380FB 2008 
1855 - Rosborough HammerHead RFV-22 Fire Protection 2008

Fire Station 56 - 230, boulevard Chèvremont, L'Île-Bizard–Sainte-Geneviève

256 - Emergency One Cyclone II 2009 1500gpm./600gal
2056 -Emergency One Cyclone II 2007 1500gpm./600gal
6056 - Freightliner M2 112 / Maxi-Métal 2011 3000gal

Fire Station 57 - 13795, boulevard Pierrefonds, Pierrefonds-Roxboro

257 -Pierce Saber FR6010 / Maxi Métal 2019 1250gpm./440gal
457 - Rosenbauer Commander 2015 / Rosenbauer Viper 100'
557 - Ford F-550 XL Super Duty / industries Lafleur 2012
1857 - 2010 Rosborough HammerHead RFV-22 rescue boat 
2164  - Dynazor DY7X14TA2 2006

Fire Station 58 - 13, rue Centre-Commercial, Pierrefonds-Roxboro

258 - Emergency One Cyclone II 2009 1500gpm./600gal

Fire Station 59 - 18661, boulevard Pierrefonds, Pierrefonds-Roxboro
259 - Spartan Metro Star MFD / Maxi Métal 2016  1250gpm/440gal
459 - Rosenbauer Commander R6000 201 / Rosenbauer Viper 100
6059 - Freightliner M2 112 / Maxi-Métal 2011 3000gal

Fire Station 61 - 10, rue Sunnydale, Dollard-des-Ormeaux

261 - Spartan Metro Star MFD / Maxi Métal 2016 1250gpm/440gal
461 - Emergency One Cyclone II 2007 30 M

Fire Station 62 - 150, avenue Avro, Dorval

262 - Spartan Metro Star MFD / Maxi Métal 2016 1250gpm./440gal

Fire Station 71 - 5500, chemin Bois-Franc, Saint-Laurent

271M - Pierce Saber FR6010 / Maxi Métal 2019 1250gpm./440gal/66gal foam
771 - Rosenbauer T-Rex 2012 115'

Division 2

112(Division Chief) - Dodge Journey R/T AWD 2014
132(Operations Chief) - Ford Explorer Police Interceptor AWD 2018
142(Operations Chief) - Ford Explorer Police Interceptor AWD 2018
171(Section Chief) - Dodge Journey R/T AWD 2015
172(Section Chief) - Dodge Journey GT AWD 2017

Fire Station 3 - 256, rue Young, Le Sud-Ouest

203 - Spartan Metro Star / Maxi-Metal 2012 1250gpm./450gal
403 - Emergency One Cyclone II 2009 100'

Fire Station 15 - 1255, rue de la Sucrerie, Le Sud-Ouest

215 - Spartan Metro Star MFD / Maxi Métal 2015 1250gpm./440gal
415 - Emergency One Cyclone II CR137 2015 / Emergency One 137'
915 - Ford F-550 XL Super Duty / Maxi-Métal 2007
1515 - Zodiac G380FB 2008 
1815 - Rosborough HammerHead RFV-22 Fire Protection 2008
2115  - Dynazor DY7X14TA2 2006

Fire Station 23 - 523, place Saint-Henri, Le Sud-Ouest
223 - Spartan Metro Star / Maxi-Métal 2015 1250gpm./500gal
423 - Emergency One Cyclone II 2009 100'

Fire Station 33 - 6040, boulevard Monk, Le Sud-Ouest

233 - Spartan Metro Star / Maxi-Métal 2015 1325gpm./475gal
433 - Rosenbauer Commander 2016 / Rosenbauer Viper 100'

Fire Station 46 - 4760, rue Cumberland, Côte-des-Neiges–Notre-Dame-de-Grâce

246 - Emergency One Cyclone II 2009 1500gpm./600gal
446 - Emergency One Cyclone II 2007 30 m.

Fire Station 63 - 530, boulevard Bouchard, Dorval

263 - 2016 Spartan Metro Star MFD / Maxi Métal VIO pumper (1250/500)
2063 - Emergency One Cyclone II 2011  1500gpm./600gal
4063 -  2020 Pierce Arrow XT 6700 platform 100' (Ascendant mid-mount) 
1988 - Olympique mobile V610TFH 2001 
9201 - Chevrolet Volt 2012
9202 - Nissan Leaf 2017
9203 - Nissan Leaf 2017 
9204 - Nissan Leaf 2017 
9205 - Ford Fiesta 2014 
9301 - Ford Fiesta SE 2013

Fire Station 64 - 3175, rue Remembrance, Lachine

264M - 2020 Pierce MaxiSaber FR7010 pumper (1320/440/66F)
464 - 2019 Rosenbauer Commander R6000 aerial (-/-/100' Viper rear-mount ladder)
564 - Ford F-550 XL Super Duty / Maxi-Métal 2007
1564 - Zodiac G380FB 2008
2164  - Dynazor DY7X14TA2 2006

Fire Station 65 - 1300, avenue Dollard, LaSalle

265 - Spartan Metro Star / Maxi-Métal 2015 1328gpm./473gal
2065 - Emergency One Cyclone II 2010 1500gpm./600gal
465 - 2019 Rosenbauer Commander R6000 aerial (-/-/100' Viper rear-mount ladder
565 - Ford F-550 Super Duty Power Stroke / Industries Lafleur 2012
1702 - GMC TC85T C5500 / Métal Grenier 2005
1703 - GMC TC85T C5500 / Métal Grenier 2005

Fire Station 66 - 4398, boulevard LaSalle, Verdun

266M - 2020 Pierce MaxiSaber FR7010 pumper (1250/440/66F)
466 - Emergency One Cyclone II HP100 2007 100'
566 - Ford F-550 XL Super Duty / Maxi-Métal 2007
2266 - MGS / National Foam 2003 220gal
1866 - Rosborough HammerHead RFV-22 Fire Protection 2008
9501 - Ford Fiesta SE 2013
9502 - Ford Fiesta SE 2013
9503 - Nissan Leaf 2017
9504 - Nissan Leaf 2017

Fire Station 67 - 911, boulevard René-Lévesque, Verdun

267 - Spartan Metro Star / Maxi-Métal 2012 1250gpm./450gal
467 - Rosenbauer Commander 2015 / Rosenbauer Viper 100'

Fire Station 77 - 114, rue Westminster Nord, Montréal-Ouest

277 - Emergency One Cyclone II 2011 1500gpm./600gal

Fire Station 78 - 6815, chemin de la Côte-Saint-Luc, Côte Saint-Luc

278 - Emergency One Cyclone II 2007 1500gpm./600gal
478 - Rosenbauer Commander 2016 / Rosenbauer Viper 100'

Division 3

110(Division Chief) - Ford Explorer Police Interceptor AWD 2014
120(Division Chief) - Ford Explorer Police Interceptor AWD 2016
123(Division Chief) - Dodge Journey R/T AWD 2014
130(Operations Chief) - Ford Explorer Police Interceptor AWD 2016
133(Operations Chief) - Ford Explorer Police Interceptor AWD 2018
143(Operations Chief) - Ford Explorer Police Interceptor AWD 2018
153(Operations Chief) - Dodge Journey R/T AWD 2015
163(Operations Chief) - Dodge Journey R/T AWD 2016
167(Section Chief) - Dodge Journey SXT 2013
177(Section Chief) - Dodge Journey R/T AWD 2017

Fire Station 4 - 5260, avenue Van Horne, Côte-des-Neiges–Notre-Dame-de-Grâce

204 - 2019 Pierce MaxiSaber FR7010 pumper (1320/440/66F) 
404 - 2019 Rosenbauer Commander R6000 aerial (-/-/100' Viper rear-mount ladder)

Fire Station  27 - 5353, rue Gatineau, Côte-des-Neiges–Notre-Dame-de-Grâce

227 - Spartan Metro Star / Maxi-Metal 2013 1250gpm./450gal
427 - Emergency One Cyclone II 2011 100'
627 - Spartan Metro Star / Maxi-Métal 2013

Fire Station 34 - 5369, chemin de la Côte-Saint-Antoine, Côte-des-Neiges–Notre-Dame-de-Grâce

234 - Spartan Metro Star / Maxi-Metal 2012 1250gpm./450gal
734 -  Rosenbauer T-Rex 2012 115'

Fire Station 35 - 10827, rue Lajeunesse, Ahuntsic-Cartierville

235 - Spartan Metro Star / Maxi-Metal 2013 1250gpm./450gal
535 - Ford F-550 Super Duty Power Stroke / Industries Lafleur 2012
1535 - Zodiac G380FB 2008 
1835 - Rosborough HammerHead RFV-22 Fire Protection 2009
2135  - Dynazor DY7X14TA2 2006
937 - Mercedes-Benz Sprinter 144 Bluetec 2500 2014
945 - Mercedes-Benz Sprinter 144 Bluetec 2500 2014
987 - Ford Escape hybrid 2011
9053 - Ford Explorer Police Interceptor AWD 2014

Fire Station 37 - 795, rue Jarry Est, Villeray–Saint-Michel–Parc-Extension

237 - Spartan Metro Star / Maxi-Metal 2013 1250gpm./450gal

Fire Station 42 - 4180, rue de Sallaberry Ouest, Ahuntsic-Cartierville

242 - Spartan Metro Star / Maxi-Métal 2015 1328gpm./502gal
442 - Rosenbauer Commander 2015 / Rosenbauer Viper 100'

Fire Station 49 - 10, rue Chabanel Ouest, Ahuntsic-Cartierville

249M - 2020 Pierce MaxiSaber FR7010 pumper (1320/440/66F)
449 - Emergency One Cyclone II 2007 100'

Fire Station 72 - 2727, boulevard Poirier, Saint-Laurent

272 - Spartan Metro Star / Maxi-Métal 2014 1325gpm./475gal
472 - Emergency One Cyclone II HP100 2007 100'
1672 - Freightliner M2-106 / Maxi Métal 2015

Fire Station 73 - 820, rue Saint-Germain, Saint-Laurent

273 - Spartan Metro Star MFD / Maxi Métal 2016 1250gpm./440gal
473 - Emergency One Cyclone II CR137 2015 / Emergency One 137'
1473 - Thomas MVP EF 2008

Fire Station 74 - 10, avenue Roosevelt, Mont-Royal

274 - Spartan Metro Star / Maxi-Métal 2014 1325pm./625gal
474 - 2011 E-One Cyclone II HP100 aerial (-/-/100' rear-mount)

Fire Station 75 - 40, avenue Saint-Just, Outremont

275 - Emergency One Cyclone II 2009 1500gpm./600gal
1330 - Freightliner MT55 Heavy Duty / Morgan Olson Route Star 2015

Fire Station 76 - 19, rue Stanton, Westmount

276 - Spartan Metro Star / Maxi-Metal 2013 1250gpm./450gal
4076 - 2020 Pierce Arrow XT 6700 platform (-/-/100' Ascendant mid-mount)
9050 - Ford Explorer Police Interceptor AWD 2014
9051 - Ford Explorer Police Interceptor AWD 2014
9401 - Ford Fiesta SE 2012
9402 - Nissan Leaf 2017
9403 - Nissan Leaf 2017
9404 - Ford Fiesta SE 2013

Division 4

114(Division Chief) - Dodge Journey GT AWD 2017
134(Operations Chief) - Ford Explorer Police Interceptor AWD 2018
144(Operations Chief) - Ford Explorer Police Interceptor AWD 2016
174(Section Chief) - Dodge Journey GT AWD 2017

Fire Station 8 - 11371, rue Notre-Dame Est, Montréal-Est

208M - Pierce Saber FR6010 / Maxi Métal 2019 1250gpm./440gal, Foam 66gal
4008 - 2020 Pierce Arrow XT 6700 platform (-/-/100' Ascendant mid-mount)

Fire Station 9 - 8100, boulevard Saint-Michel, Villeray–Saint-Michel–Parc-Extension

209 - Spartan Metro Star / Maxi-Métal 2014 1250gpm./450gal
409 - Emergency One Cyclone II 2010 100'
9302 - Nissan Leaf 2017
9303 - Nissan Leaf 2017
9304 - Nissan Leaf 2017
9801 - Nissan Leaf 2017
9802 - Nissan Leaf 2017
9803 - Nissan Leaf 2017
9804 - Toyota Yaris 2011
9805 - Ford Fiesta 2014

Fire Station 14 - 8216, boulevard Maurice-Duplessis, Rivière-des-Prairies–Pointe-aux-Trembles

214 - 2016 Spartan Metro Star MFD / Maxi Métal VIO pumper (1250/500)
514 - Ford F-550 XL Super Duty / Maxi-Métal 2007
1814 - Rosborough HammerHead RFV-22 Fire Protection 2011
2214 - MGS / National Foam 2003 220gal

Fire Station 17 - 4240, rue de Charleroi, Montréal-Nord

217 - Emergency One Cyclone II 2011 1500gpm./600gal
417 - Rosenbauer Commander 2016 / Rosenbauer Viper 100'
911 - Mercedes-Benz Sprinter 170 Bluetec 2500 2014
912 - Mercedes-Benz Sprinter 170 Bluetec 2500 2014
913 - Dodge Journey SXT 2013
914 - Dodge Journey SXT 2013
1617 - Freightliner M2-106 / Maxi Métal 2015

Fire Station 18 - 12012, boulevard Rolland, Montréal-Nord
 
218M - Pierce Saber FR6010 / Maxi Métal 2019 1250gpm./440gal, Foam 66gal
418 - Emergency One Cyclone II HP100 2007 100'

Fire Station 21 - 6025, boulevard Lavoisier, Saint-Léonard

221 - Emergency One Cyclone II 2011 1500gpm./600gal
421 - Rosenbauer Commander 2016 / Rosenbauer Viper 100'

Fire Station 22 - 5455, rue Antonio-Dagenais, Saint-Léonard

222 - Emergency One Cyclone II 2009 1500gpm./600gal
1922 - Haulmark 2010
4022 - 2020 Pierce Arrow XT 6700 platform (-/-/100' Ascendant mid-mount)

Fire Station 28 - 7650, boulevard Châteauneuf, Anjou

228M - 2020 Pierce MaxiSaber FR7010 pumper (1250/440/66F)
428 - Emergency One Cyclone II 2010 30 m.
9901 - Nissan Leaf 2017
9902 - Nissan Leaf 2017
9903 - Nissan Leaf 2017
9904 - Ford Focus SE Electric 2012
9905 - Ford Fiesta 2014

Fire Station 32 - 16101, rue Sherbrooke Est, Rivière-des-Prairies–Pointe-aux-Trembles

232 - Spartan Metro Star MFD / Maxi Métal 2016 1250gpm./440gal

Fire Station 38 - 14201, rue Sherbrooke Est, Rivière-des-Prairies–Pointe-aux-Trembles

238M - 2020 Pierce MaxiSaber FR7010 pumper (1250/440/66F)
438 - 2016 Rosenbauer Commander R6000 aerial (-/-/100' Viper rear-mount ladder)
538 - Ford F-550 XL Super Duty / Maxi-Métal 2007
2038 - Spartan Gladiator / Superior 1995 1050gpm./500gal
1838 - Rosborough HammerHead RFV-22 Fire Protection 2010
2138 - Dynazor DY7X14TA2 2006

Fire Station 43 - 1945, rue Fleury Est, Ahuntsic-Cartierville

243 - Spartan Metro Star / Maxi-Métal 2014 1250gpm./450gal
443 - Emergency One Cyclone II 2009 100'

Fire Station 44 - 12145, boulevard Rivières-des-Prairies, Rivière-des-Prairies–Pointe-aux-Trembles

244 - Emergency One Cyclone II 2010 1500gpm./600gal
444 - 2019 Rosenbauer Commander R6000 aerial (-/-/100' Viper rear-mount ladder)

Division 5

115(Division Chief) - Dodge Journey R/T AWD 2014
135(Operations Chief) - Ford Explorer Police Interceptor AWD 2018
145(Operations Chief) - Ford Explorer Police Interceptor AWD 2018

Fire Station 13 - 3250, rue Sainte-Catherine Est, Mercier–Hochelaga-Maisonneuve

213 - 2021 Pierce MaxiSaber FR7010 pumper (1250/440)
613 - 2013 Spartan Metro Star LFD / Maxi Métal walk-around technical rescue
935 - Ford Explorer Police Interceptor AWD 2018

Fire Station 26 - 2151, avenue du Mont-Royal Est, Le Plateau-Mont-Royal

***Closed for renovations***

Fire Station 29 - 5375, 1ere Avenue, Rosemont–La Petite-Patrie

229 - Spartan Metro Star / Maxi-Métal 2014 1250gpm./450gal
429 - Emergency One Cyclone II 2009 100'
1729 - 2017 Pierce Impel 8420 walk-in hazmat/command (SN#30774)
1799 - Ford Cargo 8000 / Maxi-Métal 1995

Fire Station 30 - 5, rue Laurier Ouest, Le Plateau-Mont-Royal

230 - 2021 Pierce MaxiSaber FR7010 pumper (1250/440)
430 - 2019 Rosenbauer Commander R6000 aerial (-/-/100' Viper rear-mount ladder)
1230 – 2006 Ford Econoline E350 Super Duty

Fire Station 31 - 7041, rue Saint-Dominique, Rosemont–La Petite-Patrie

231 - Spartan Metro Star / Maxi-Metal 2012 1250gpm./450gal

Fire Station 39 - 2915, rue Monsabré, Mercier–Hochelaga-Maisonneuve

239 - Spartan Metro Star / Maxi-Métal 2014 1250gpm./450gal

Fire Station 40 - 8639, rue Pierre-de-Coubertin, Mercier–Hochelaga-Maisonneuve

240 - Emergency One Cyclone II 2010 1500gpm./600gal
440 - Emergency One Cyclone II HP100 2007 100'

Fire Station 41 - 7405, rue Champagneur, Villeray–Saint-Michel–Parc-Extension

241 - Emergency One Cyclone II 2010 1500gpm./600gal
441 - Emergency One Cyclone II 2007 30 m.

Fire Station 45 - 5100, rue Hochelaga, Mercier–Hochelaga-Maisonneuve

245 - Emergency One Cyclone II 2011 1500gpm./600gal
445 - Rosenbauer Commander 2016 / Rosenbauer Viper 100'
8045 – 2014 Ram 3500 Heavy Duty Turbo Diesel

Fire Station 47 - 2111, rue Saint-Zotique, Rosemont–La Petite-Patrie

247 - 2021 Pierce MaxiSaber FR7010 pumper (1250/440)
447 - 2019 Rosenbauer Commander R6000 aerial (-/-/100' Viper rear-mount ladder)
647 - 2013 Spartan Metro Star LFD / Maxi Métal walk-around technical rescue
947 - Sterling L7500 / Industries Lafleur 2006

Fire Station 48 - 3616, rue Hochelaga, Mercier–Hochelaga-Maisonneuve

248 - Emergency One Cyclone II 2010 1500gpm./600gal
448 - Emergency One Cyclone II HP100 2007 100'

Fire Station 50 - 6490, 30e Avenue, Rosemont–La Petite-Patrie

250 - Emergency One Cyclone II 2011 1500gpm./600gal
450 - Emergency One Cyclone II 2010 100'

Division 6

116 (Division Chief) - Dodge Journey R/T AWD 2015
136 (Operations Chief) - Ford Explorer Police Interceptor AWD 2018
176 (Section Chief) - Dodge Journey GT AWD 2017

Fire Station 2 - 10, chemin du Tour-de-L`isle, Ville-Marie

2019 - Spartan Metro Star / Maxi-Métal 2012 1250gpm./450gal

Fire Station 5 - 75, rue Ontario Est, Ville-Marie

205 - 2021 Pierce MaxiSaber FR7010 pumper (1250/440)
405 - 2019 Rosenbauer Commander R6000 aerial (-/-/100' Viper rear-mount ladder)
Mobile Command Post 1005 – 2015 Pierce Velocity
1605 – 2015 Freightliner M2 106 / Maxi Métal 2015
9052 – 2014 Ford Fiesta
9601 – 2013 Ford Fiesta SE
9602 – 2017 Nissan Leaf
9603 – 2017 Nissan Leaf
9604 – 2017 Nissan Leaf

Fire Station 10 - 1445, rue Saint-Mathieu, Ville-Marie

210 - 2021 Pierce MaxiSaber FR7010 pumper (1250/440)
410 - Emergency One Cyclone II 2009 100'

Fire Station 16 - 1041, rue Rachel, Le Plateau-Mont-Royal

216 - 2021 Pierce MaxiSaber FR7010 pumper (1250/440)
416 - Emergency One Cyclone II 2009 100'

Fire Station 19 - 2000, avenue de Lorimier, Ville-Marie

219M - 2020 Pierce MaxiSaber FR7010 pumper (1320/440/66F)
419 - Emergency One Cyclone II 2007 100'

Fire Station 20 - 920, rue Saint-Urbain, Ville-Marie

220 - Spartan Metro Star / Maxi-Métal 2015 1250gpm./450gal
420 - Rosenbauer Commander 2016 / Rosenbauer Viper 100'

Fire Station 25 - 1212, rue Drummond, Ville-Marie

225 - Spartan Metro Star / Maxi-Métal 2015 1250gpm./450gal
425 - 2010 E-One Cyclone II HP 100 aerial (-/-/100' rear-mount)

Marine Rescue
SIM's Sauvetage nautique provides marine rescue and ice rescue operations around the city.

SIM does not have a full dedicated fire boat. Sauvetage nautique team has a fleet of small vessels for near-shore rescue and ice rescue operations:

 UMA17 - 5 small boat with sled like hull and outboard motor to support ice rescue operations - built by L’Arsenal
 Hammerhead RFV22 (C20275QC) - primary marine rescue boat operating when waterways are ice free
 pneumatic boats (inflatable) - for inland water rescue operations 

SIM can also be assisted by the Canadian Coast Guard Inland Rescue Boat Station in Montreal, which can provide rescue assistance and some firefighting capabilities. In the Port of Montreal, private companies like Océan Remorquage Montréal operate tugboats that have firefighting capabilities.

References

External links
 Stations, fleet and interventions

Montreal
Public services in Montreal
2002 establishments in Quebec